The New Forest and Hampshire County Show, or more commonly known as the New Forest Show, is an annual agricultural show event held for three days at the end of July in New Park, near Brockenhurst in Hampshire, southern England, UK. The first New Forest Show was held on 1st September 1920, and in 2006, it celebrated its 80th show. In 2020 organisers was to have celebrated the  New Forest Show's Centennial, but the COVID-19 pandemic caused it to be cancelled. The 94th Show will take place on 27–29 July 2021 at New Park, Brockenhurst.

The show attracts over 100,000 visitors every year, and brings together a celebration of traditional country pursuits, crafts, produce and entertainment. Show jumping is another major feature at the show and there are competitive classes throughout all three days. A full range of equestrian classes also features, as well as livestock competitions including pigs, cattle and sheep, plus a poultry section, rabbits, cage birds, and honey bees.

External links

New Forest Show Website 
An Illustrated History Of The New Forest Show 

Show
Agricultural shows in England
1921 establishments in England
Recurring events established in 1921
Events in Hampshire